Thammahetti Mudalige Samarasinghe (26 August 1942 – 4 June 2004) was a Sri Lankan cricket umpire. He officiated in Sri Lankan domestic and international cricket matches from 1992 to 1998. He stood in seven Test matches between 1992 and 1993 and 14 ODI games between 1992 and 1998.

See also
 List of Test cricket umpires
 List of One Day International cricket umpires

References

2004 deaths
1942 births
Sri Lankan Test cricket umpires
Sri Lankan One Day International cricket umpires